Mettet is a municipality of Wallonia located in the province of Namur, Belgium. 

On 1 January 2006 Mettet had 11,977 inhabitants. The total area is 116.78 km², giving a population density of 103 inhabitants per km².

The municipality consists of the following districts: Biesme, Biesmerée, Ermeton-sur-Biert, Furnaux, Graux, Mettet, Oret, Saint-Gérard, and Stave.

Circuit Jules Tacheny
In Mettet there is a race track, Circuit Jules Tacheny Mettet, for motorbikes and cars.

Notable people
Alain Crépin (1954–), conductor and musician

See also
 List of protected heritage sites in Mettet

References

External links
 
Official website (in French)
Official website of race track "Jules Tacheny" (in French and Dutch)
Motorbike Race Circuit "Jules Tacheny" (in French)
Mettet d'autrefois, Site of old postcards and old photographs of Mettet. Collection of PIERRE HUBOT

 
Municipalities of Namur (province)